Solomon is a city in Dickinson and Saline counties in the U.S. state of Kansas.  As of the 2020 census, the population of the city was 993.  It is located approximately 6 miles west of Abilene.

History
The first post office at Solomon was established in October, 1860.

Solomon was founded in 1866. It was named from its position near the mouth of the Solomon River. Solomon was incorporated as a city in 1871.

Geography
Solomon is located at  (38.918578, -97.369665).

Demographics

The Saline County portion of Solomon is part of the Salina Micropolitan Statistical Area.

2010 census
The result of the census of 2010, there were 1,095 people, 433 households, and 295 families living in the city. The racial makeup of the city was 96.1% White, 0.3% Native American, 0.2% Asian, 0.9% from other races, and 2.6% from two or more races. Hispanic or Latino of any race were 2.1% of the population.

There were 433 households, of which 35.8% had children under the age of 18 living with them, 52.0% were married couples living together, 11.1% had a female householder with no husband present, 5.1% had a male householder with no wife present, and 31.9% were non-families. 27.0% of all households were made up of individuals, and 12.7% had someone living alone who was 65 years of age or older. The average household size was 2.53 and the average family size was 3.08.

The median age in the city was 36.4 years. 27.7% of residents were under the age of 18; 8% were between the ages of 18 and 24; 27.8% were from 25 to 44; 22.6% were from 45 to 64; and 13.8% were 65 years of age or older. The gender makeup of the city was 49.5% male and 50.5% female.

2000 census
As of the census of 2000, there were 1,072 people, 416 households, and 302 families living in the city. The racial makeup of the city was 98.32% White, 0.19% Native American, 0.09% Asian, 0.93% from other races, and 0.47% from two or more races. Hispanic or Latino of any race were 2.15% of the population.

There were 416 households, out of which 38.9% had children under the age of 18 living with them, 57.0% were married couples living together, 12.5% had a female householder with no husband present, and 27.2% were non-families. 23.3% of all households were made up of individuals, and 10.6% had someone living alone who was 65 years of age or older. The average household size was 2.56 and the average family size was 3.01.

In the city, the population was spread out, with 31.5% under the age of 18, 6.0% from 18 to 24, 29.8% from 25 to 44, 20.8% from 45 to 64, and 11.9% who were 65 years of age or older. The median age was 36 years. For every 100 females, there were 100.7 males. For every 100 females age 18 and over, there were 90.2 males.

The median income for a household in the city was $40,469, and the median income for a family was $48,203. Males had a median income of $34,926 versus $19,063 for females. The per capita income for the city was $16,800. About 8.6% of families and 13.6% of the population were below the poverty line, including 19.3% of those under age 18 and 9.0% of those age 65 or over.

Economy
Solomon Corporation is the largest employer in Solomon.  It is the largest rebuilder of oil-filled transformers in the United States.

Education
The community is served by Solomon USD 393 public school district.

Notable people
See List of people from Dickinson County, Kansas
 Archie Butcher, head college football coach of Ottawa University
 Algo Henderson, president of Antioch College
 Kenneth McLeod, Canadian politician
 Seymour Stedman, lawyer and Socialist candidate for Vice-President of the United States

See also
 Lincoln Township, Dickinson County, Kansas

References

Further reading

External links

 City of Solomon
 Solomon - Directory of Public Officials
 Historic Images of Solomon, Special Photo Collections at Wichita State University Library
 Solomon city map, KDOT

Cities in Kansas
Cities in Dickinson County, Kansas
Cities in Saline County, Kansas
Salina, Kansas micropolitan area
1866 establishments in Kansas
Populated places established in 1866